The Babson Park Woman's Club is a historic woman's club in Babson Park, Florida. It is located at 1300 North Scenic Highway. On October 17, 1997, it was added to the U.S. National Register of Historic Places.

See also
List of Registered Historic Woman's Clubhouses in Florida

References

External links
 Polk County listings at National Register of Historic Places
 Babson Park Woman's Club at Florida's Office of Cultural and Historical Programs

National Register of Historic Places in Polk County, Florida
Women's clubs in Florida
Women's club buildings in Florida